The Loughor bridge is a road bridge crossing over the River Loughor, providing a convenient link between much of western Swansea and Llanelli, west Wales.  The bridge is part of the A484 road.  The road bridge is adjacent to the Loughor railway viaduct.  A permanent bridge linking Loughor and Llanelli was first constructed in 1923. Evidence of the old bridge can still be seen from the right side of the new bridge crossing from loughor, a parapet jutting out into the river which is now a seating area and support foundations can also be seen in the river bed at low tides.

If travelling over the bridge east, you will enter the county of Swansea and South Wales when leaving the bridge. If travelling west, you will enter the county of Carmarthenshire and the West Wales area when leaving the bridge.

When leaving the bridge if heading west, the road signs change from English/Welsh to Welsh/English (Welsh written before English). This is due to the much higher use of the Welsh language in West Wales.

Bridges in Swansea
Bridges in Carmarthenshire